The International Mathematical Union (IMU) is an international non-governmental organization devoted to international cooperation in the field of mathematics across the world. It is a member of the International Science Council (ISC) and supports the International Congress of Mathematicians (ICM). Its members are national mathematics organizations from more than 80 countries.

The objectives of the International Mathematical Union are: promoting international cooperation in mathematics, supporting and assisting the International Congress of Mathematicians and other international scientific meetings/conferences, acknowledging outstanding research contributions to mathematics through the awarding of scientific prizes, and encouraging and supporting other international mathematical activities, considered likely to contribute to the development of mathematical science in any of its aspects, whether pure, applied, or educational.

History
The IMU was established in 1920, but dissolved in September 1932 and then re-established in 1950 de facto at the Constitutive Convention in New York, de jure on September 10, 1951, when ten countries had become members. The last milestone was the General Assembly in March 1952, in Rome, Italy where the activities of the new IMU were inaugurated and the first Executive Committee, President and various commissions were elected. In 1952 the IMU was also readmitted to the ICSU. The past president of the Union is Carlos Kenig (2019–2022). The current president is Hiraku Nakajima.

At the 16th meeting of the IMU General Assembly in Bangalore, India, in August 2010, Berlin was chosen as the location of the permanent office of the IMU, which was opened on January 1, 2011, and is hosted by the Weierstrass Institute for Applied Analysis and Stochastics  (WIAS), an institute of the Gottfried Wilhelm Leibniz Scientific Community, with about 120 scientists engaging in mathematical research applied to complex problems in industry and commerce.

Commissions and committees
IMU has a close relationship to mathematics education through its International Commission on Mathematical Instruction (ICMI). This commission is organized similarly to IMU with its own Executive Committee and General Assembly.

Developing countries are a high priority for the IMU and a significant percentage of its budget, including grants received from individuals, mathematical societies, foundations, and funding agencies, is spent on activities for developing countries. Since 2011 this has been coordinated by the Commission for Developing Countries (CDC).

The Committee for Women in Mathematics (CWM) is concerned with issues related to women in mathematics worldwide. It organizes the World Meeting for Women in Mathematics  as a satellite event of ICM.

The International Commission on the History of Mathematics (ICHM) is operated jointly by the IMU and the Division of the History of Science (DHS) of the International Union of History and Philosophy of Science (IUHPS).

The Committee on Electronic Information and Communication (CEIC) advises IMU on matters concerning mathematical information, communication, and publishing.

Prizes
The scientific prizes awarded by the IMU, in the quadrennial International Congress of Mathematicians (ICM), are deemed to be some of the highest distinctions in the mathematical world. These are:
 the Fields Medals (two to four awarded per Congress, since 1936);
 the IMU Abacus Medal (previously known as the Rolf Nevanlinna Prize; awarded since 1986);
 the Carl Friedrich Gauss Prize (since 2006); 
 the Chern Medal (since 2010); and
 the Leelavati Award (since 2010).

Membership and General Assembly
The IMU's members are Member Countries and each Member country is represented through an Adhering Organization, which may be its principal academy, a mathematical society, its research council or some other institution or association of institutions, or an appropriate agency of its government. A country starting to develop its mathematical culture and interested in building links with mathematicians all over the world is invited to join IMU as an Associate Member. For the purpose of facilitating jointly sponsored activities and jointly pursuing the objectives of the IMU, multinational mathematical societies and professional societies can join IMU as an Affiliate Member. Every four years the IMU membership gathers in a General Assembly (GA) which consists of delegates appointed by the Adhering Organizations, together with the members of the executive committee. All important decisions are made at the GA, including the election of the officers, establishment of commissions, the approval of the budget, and any changes to the statutes and by-laws.

Organization and Executive Committee
The International Mathematical Union is administered by an executive committee (EC) which conducts the business of the Union. The EC consists of the President, two Vice-Presidents, the Secretary, six Members-at-Large, all elected for a term of four years, and the Past President. The EC is responsible for all policy matters and for tasks, such as choosing the members of the ICM Program Committee and various prize committees.

Publications
Every two months IMU publishes an electronic newsletter, IMU-Net, that aims to improve communication between IMU and the worldwide mathematical community by reporting on decisions and recommendations of the Union, major international mathematical events and developments, and on other topics of general mathematical interest. IMU Bulletins are published annually with the aim to inform IMU's members about the Union's current activities. In 2009 IMU published the document Best Current Practices for Journals.

IMU’s Involvement in developing countries
The IMU took its first organized steps towards the promotion of mathematics in developing countries in the early 1970s and has, since then supported various activities. In 2010 IMU formed the Commission for Developing Countries (CDC) which brings together all of the past and current initiatives in support of mathematics and mathematicians in the developing world.

Some IMU Supported Initiatives:
Grants Program for Mathematicians: The Commission for Developing Countries supports research travel of mathematicians based in developing countries as well as mathematics research conferences in the developing world through its Grants Program which is open to mathematicians throughout the developing world, including countries that are not (yet) members of the IMU.
African Mathematics Millennium Science Initiative (AMMSI) is a network of mathematics centers in sub-Saharan Africa that organizes conferences and workshops, visiting lectureships and an extensive scholarship program for mathematics graduate students doing PhD work on the African continent.
Mentoring African Research in Mathematics (MARM): IMU supported the London Mathematical Society (LMS) in founding the MARM programme, which supports mathematics and its teaching in the countries of sub-Saharan Africa via a mentoring partnership between mathematicians in the United Kingdom and African colleagues, together with their students. It focuses on cultivating long-term mentoring relations between individual mathematicians and students.
Volunteer Lecturer Program (VLP) of IMU identifies mathematicians interested in contributing to the formation of young mathematicians in the developing world. The Volunteer Lecturer Program maintains a database of mathematic volunteers willing to offer month-long intensive courses at the advanced undergraduate or graduate level in degree programmes at universities in the developing world. IMU also seeks applications from universities and mathematics degree programmes in the developing world that are in need of volunteer lecturers, and that can provide the necessary conditions for productive collaboration in the teaching of advanced mathematics.

IMU also supports the International Commission on Mathematical Instruction (ICMI) with its programmes, exhibits and workshops in emerging countries, especially in Asia and Africa.

IMU released a report in 2008, Mathematics in Africa: Challenges and Opportunities, on the current state of mathematics in Africa and on opportunities for new initiatives to support mathematical development. In 2014, the IMU's Commission for Developing Countries CDC released an update of the report.

Additionally, reports about Mathematics in Latin America and the Caribbean and South East Asia. were published.

In July 2014 IMU released the report: The International Mathematical Union in the Developing World: Past, Present and Future (July 2014).

MENAO Symposium at the ICM 

In 2014, the IMU held a day-long symposium prior to the opening of the International Congress of Mathematicians (ICM), entitled Mathematics in Emerging Nations: Achievements and Opportunities (MENAO). Approximately 260 participants from around the world, including representatives of embassies, scientific institutions, private business and foundations attended this session. Attendees heard inspiring stories of individual mathematicians and specific developing nations.

Members
Member Countries:
Associate Members:
Sociedad Ecuatoriana de Matemática - SEdeM
Mathematical Society of Kyrgyzstan
Mathematics Association of Kenya (MAK)
Mathematical Association of Thailand, The Center for Promotion of Mathematical Research of Thailand (CEPMART)
Committee for Mathematics of Cambodia
Mathematical Society of the Republic of Moldova
Committee for Mathematics of Nepal
Committee for Mathematics of Oman
Affiliate Members:
African Mathematical Union (AMU)
European Mathematical Society (EMS)
South East Asian Mathematical Society (SEAMS)
Unión Matemática de América Latina y el Caribe (UMALCA)
Candidacies for Membership: Currently there are no candidacies for membership.

Presidents 
List of presidents of the International Mathematical Union from 1952 to the present:

1952–1954:  Marshall Harvey Stone (vice:  Émile Borel,  Erich Kamke)

1955–1958:  Heinz Hopf (vice:  Arnaud Denjoy,  W. V. D. Hodge)

1959–1962:  Rolf Nevanlinna (vice:  Pavel Alexandrov,  Marston Morse)

1963–1966:  Georges de Rham (vice:  Henri Cartan,  Kazimierz Kuratowski)

1967–1970:  Henri Cartan (vice:  Mikhail Lavrentyev,  Deane Montgomery)

1971–1974:  K. S. Chandrasekharan (vice:  Abraham Adrian Albert,  Lev Pontryagin)

1975–1978:  Deane Montgomery (vice:  J. W. S. Cassels,  Miron Nicolescu,  Gheorghe Vrânceanu)

1979–1982:  Lennart Carleson (vice:  Masayoshi Nagata,  Yuri Vasilyevich Prokhorov)

1983–1986:  Jürgen Moser (vice:  Ludvig Faddeev,  Jean-Pierre Serre)

1987–1990:  Ludvig Faddeev (vice:  Walter Feit,  Lars Hörmander)

1991–1994:  Jacques-Louis Lions (vice:  John H. Coates,  David Mumford)

1995–1998:  David Mumford (vice:  Vladimir Arnold,  Albrecht Dold)

1999–2002:  Jacob Palis (vice:  Simon Donaldson,  Shigefumi Mori)

2003–2006:  John M. Ball (vice:  Jean-Michel Bismut,  Masaki Kashiwara)

2007–2010:  László Lovász (vice:  Zhi-Ming Ma,  Claudio Procesi)

2011–2014:  Ingrid Daubechies (vice:  Christiane Rousseau,  Marcelo Viana)

2015–2018:  Shigefumi Mori (vice:  Alicia Dickenstein,  Vaughan Jones)

2019–2022:  Carlos Kenig (vice:  Nalini Joshi,  Loyiso Nongxa)

2023–2026: Hiraku Nakajima (vice:  Ulrike Tillmann,  Tatiana Toro)

References

Further reading
 
 IMU Newsletter

External links 
International Mathematical Union
First Woman President of the International Mathematical Union , August 2010, AlphaGalileo
Fields Medal 2010 
African Mathematics Millennium Science Initiative (AMMSI)
Mentoring African Research in Mathematics (MARM) (archive)
IMU, International Mathematical Union
International Mathematical Union Fields Medal

 
Organizations established in 1920
Organizations established in 1932
Organizations established in 1951
Members of the International Science Council